Kirk Karwoski is an American world champion powerlifter. Kirk is a 7 time USPF National Powerlifting Champion, a 6 time IPF World Powerlifting Champion and an IPF Junior World Powerlifting Champion.

Kirk is widely considered one of the greatest squatters in the history of powerlifting, he currently holds the International Powerlifting Federation equipped world record in the squat of 455 kg.(1,003 lbs.) in  the 125 kg. weight class which was set in 1995. Leading up to that competition he squatted that 1000 lbs. for 2 reps in training.

Many people recognize Kirk's 800lbs x 5 raw squat to be the most impressive set in history, as he wasn't even at his max weight at the time.

References

American powerlifters
American strength athletes
Living people
Year of birth missing (living people)